Fiorenzo Crippa (24 January 1926 – 24 September 2017) was an Italian racing cyclist. He rode in the 1952 Tour de France.

References

External links
 

1926 births
2017 deaths
Italian male cyclists
Place of birth missing
Cyclists from the Province of Monza e Brianza